The Zaouïa Formation, also known as the Zaouïa Schists, is a Middle Ordovician (Darriwilian) geologic formation in Algeria.

Description 
The Zaouïa Formation consists of slightly metamorphosed green or grey micaceous mudstones with many intercalated tuff beds.

Fossil content 
The following fossils were reported from the formation:

 Blastozoa
 Lepidocalix pulcher
 Trilobites
 Colpocoryphe arago
 Pharostoma pulchra
 Hydrozoa
 Inocaulis gigas
 Pterobranchia
 Thallograptus barbieri
 Dendrograptus sp.
 ?Airograptus betieri
 Strophomenata
 Actinomena orta
 ?Strophomena barbieri

See also 
 Fezouata Formation
 Ordovician radiation

References

Bibliography 
 

Geologic formations of Algeria
Ordovician System of Africa
Darriwilian
Mudstone formations
Tuff formations
Ordovician south paleopolar deposits
Paleontology in Algeria
Formations